The Boxing at the 1985 Southeast Asian Games was held at the Nimibutr Gymnasium in the National Sport Complex, Bangkok, Thailand. the Boxing was held between December 12 to December 16.

Medals by event

References
BASOC (1985) 13th SEA Games Official Report, Thailand

Boxing at the Southeast Asian Games
1985 Southeast Asian Games
1985 in boxing